Le Grand Café is a famous café and brasserie in Moulins in the French department of Allier, located at 49, place d'Allier, in the town centre. It was created in 1898 and its inner architecture is representative of the Neo-rococo late 19th century style and features large wall mirrors, stucco, wrought iron, murals and ceiling paintings, as well as a large glass roof. Le Grand Café was listed as an official historical monument in February 1978.

The Grand Café was frequented by Coco Chanel (who may have sung there, since at this time Le Grand Café was also a café-chantant) and Georges Simenon during their youths. In his novel Maigret Goes Home, a chapter is set in Le Grand Café but the 1959 movie Maigret et l'Affaire Saint-Fiacre  based on the book and directed by Jean Delannoy with Jean Gabin playing Maigret was not shot in the actual café but in interiors constructed in a Paris film studio. The 2008 television movie Coco Chanel had scenes shot in the Grand Café.

Photos gallery

References

Partially translated from the French Wikipedia article.

Buildings and structures in Moulins, Allier
Monuments historiques of Allier
Coffeehouses and cafés in France